The Downing Professorship of the Laws of England is one of the senior professorships in law at the University of Cambridge.

The chair was founded in 1800 as a bequest of Sir George Downing, the founder of Downing College, Cambridge. The professorship was originally attached solely to Downing College (although the Professor undertook University activities). In the early 20th Century, for financial reasons, this professorship, together with the Downing Professor of Medicine, was severed from the College.

The original electors of the chair were the Archbishop of Canterbury, the Archbishop of York, and the masters of the colleges of Clare, St John's and Downing.

In 1788 Edward Christian, brother of Fletcher Christian, was appointed to the post prior to its official creation 12 years later.  The current holder is Lionel Smith, who was elected to the position in 2022.

Downing professors
 Edward Christian (1788/1800)
 Thomas Starkie (1823)
 Andrew Amos (1849)
 William Lloyd Birkbeck (1860)
 Frederic William Maitland (1888)
 Courtney Stanhope Kenny (1907)
 Harold Dexter Hazeltine (1919)
 Emlyn Capel Stewart Wade (1945)
 Sir W. Ivor Jennings (1962)
 Richard Meredith Jackson (1966)
 Stanley Alexander de Smith (1970)
 Gareth H. Jones (1975)
 Sir John H. Baker (1998)
 Dame Sarah Worthington (2011)
 Lionel Smith (2022)

References 

Laws of England, Downing
School of the Humanities and Social Sciences, University of Cambridge
English law
1800 establishments in England
Laws of England, Downing, Cambridge